Finnås is a former municipality in the old Hordaland county, Norway. The  municipality, which existed from 1838 until 1916, was located in the traditional district of Sunnhordland. Originally, the municipality encompassed all of the island of Bømlo, the small surrounding islands, and the mainland located south of the Bømlafjorden. It was located in the present-day municipalities of Bømlo and Sveio.

The Kulleseid Canal is a canal that was built in the 1800s on a small isthmus on the island of Bømlo.  It enabled boats to journey between the east and west sides of Bømlo island. Today the channel is surrounded by a small trading center and tourist center, and it is a popular guest harbor.

History
The parish of Findaas was established as a municipality on 1 January 1838 (see formannskapsdistrikt law). In 1865, the southern mainland district of Findaas (population: 2,237) and the Vikebygd area of the neighboring municipality of Fjelberg (population: 1,062) were merged to form the new municipality of Sveen.  On 1 January 1868, a small part of Finnaas (population: 10) was transferred to the neighboring municipality of Fitje.  On 1 April 1870, the Øklandsgrend area (population: 247) was transferred from Finnaas to the neighboring municipality of Stord.  The spelling of the name changed slightly over time from Findaas to Finnaas and then finally to Finnås.

On 1 July 1916, the municipality of Finnås was split to create three new (smaller) municipalities:
Bremnes (population: 3,411), the  northern/western half of the island of Bømlo and smaller surrounding islands
Moster (population: 1,316), the  southeastern peninsula on the island of Bømlo, the island of Moster, and the smaller surrounding islands
Bømmel (population: 1,217), the  southwestern peninsula on the island of Bømlo and smaller surrounding islands (later renamed Bømlo).

On 1 January 1963, the three municipalities were merged into a new, larger Bømlo Municipality.

Notable residents
Haldor Andreas Haldorsen (1883–1965), politician  elected to the Norwegian Parliament from Hordaland
Ola Olsen (1891–1973), politician  elected to the Norwegian Parliament from Hordaland
Gerhard Meidell Gerhardsen (1885–1931), bailiff and politician for the Conservative Party and Centre Party
Gerhard Meidell Gerhardsen (1912–1986), economist

See also
List of former municipalities of Norway

References

Bømlo
Former municipalities of Norway
1838 establishments in Norway
1916 disestablishments in Norway